Lois Jane Frankel (born May 16, 1948) is an American politician and lawyer who has been the United States representative for Florida's 22nd congressional district since 2023 and who represented Florida's 22nd congressional district from 2013 to 2017 and Florida's 21st congressional district from 2017 to 2023. She is a member of the Democratic Party.

Frankel was a member of the Florida House of Representatives for fourteen years, serving as Minority Leader of the Florida State House. She was elected mayor of West Palm Beach, Florida, in 2003, serving two terms in office until leaving office in 2011 due to term limits.

Early life and education
Frankel was born to a Jewish family on May 16, 1948 in New York City and received a bachelor's degree from Boston University in 1970. She earned a Juris Doctor from Georgetown University Law Center in 1973. Frankel moved to West Palm Beach, Florida, in 1974.

Florida House of Representatives (1987–2003)

Elections
In 1986 incumbent Democratic state representative Eleanor Weinstock of the 83rd district decided to run for a seat in the Florida Senate. Frankel ran for Weinstock's open seat in the Florida House and defeated Republican nominee Gerald Adams 69%–31%. In 1988 she won reelection to a second term unopposed; in 1990 she again was unopposed.

In November 1991 Frankel resigned as state representative to run for Congress in 1992. Mimi McAndrews, a former aide of Frankel's, was elected to replace her. Frankel lost to fellow Democratic representative Alcee Hastings in the 1992 congressional primary. In 1994 Frankel defeated McAndrews in the Democratic primary for her old State House seat. Frankel won the November general election with 55% of the vote. In 1996, she won reelection to a fifth term with 68% of the vote.

In 1998 Frankel was reelected to a sixth term with 64% of the vote. In 2000 she was reelected to a seventh term with 63% of the vote.

Tenure
During her first period as a state legislator, Frankel was State House Majority Whip. While in office from 1995 to 2003, she became the first female House Minority Leader in Florida's history and co-authored a change to Florida's already existing AIDS omnibus law originally passed in 1988. She left office due to term limits in 2002 after serving 14 years in the State House.

Committee assignments
Fiscal Responsibility Council
AIDS Task Force (committee chair)
Select Committee of the Whole
Select Committee on Child Abuse & Neglect (committee chair)

1992 congressional election

In 1992 Frankel retired from the State House to run for the newly created Florida's 23rd district. In the Democratic primary she came in first with 35% of the vote, but failed to reach the 50% threshold necessary to win outright and avoid a runoff election. In the runoff, former U.S. District Court Judge Alcee Hastings defeated Frankel 57%–43%.

2002 gubernatorial election

In 2002, Frankel entered and then dropped out of the 2002 election for Governor of Florida, in which Governor Jeb Bush won re-election.

Mayor of West Palm Beach (2003–2011)
On March 11, 2003, Frankel defeated incumbent Democratic West Palm Beach Mayor Joel T. Daves III in the mayoral election. She was endorsed in the race by former West Palm Beach Mayor Nancy Graham. Frankel won with 56% of the vote to Daves's 38%. She was sworn into office on March 27, 2003. In 2007 she was reelected, defeating Al Zucaro by 58%–42%.

On March 31, 2011, due to term limits, Frankel left office after two terms. In the race to succeed her, West Palm Beach city commissioner Jeri Muoio was elected that month with 51% of the vote, on a platform of business development and pension reform.

U.S. House of Representatives

Elections

2012

On March 21, 2011, Frankel announced that she would run in the newly redrawn Florida's 22nd congressional district in the 2012 House election. She was initially due to face freshman incumbent Republican Allen West, but redistricting had made the 22nd much more Democratic than its predecessor, prompting West to move to the neighboring 18th district and seek reelection there. On August 14 Frankel won the Democratic primary over Kristin Jacobs, and advanced to the general election against Republican Adam Hasner.

Frankel was criticized for accepting $20,000 from Digital Domain Media Group for her campaign five months after the company was awarded a downtown project that included incentives from the city of West Palm Beach, and in response vowed to give the contribution to charity. She won the general election on November 6, 2012, defeating Hasner 54.7% to 45.3%.

2014

With no Democratic primary opponents, Frankel won the general election on November 4, 2014, defeating Republican Paul Spain, winner of his low-turnout primary, 58% to 42%.

2016
 
For her first two terms, Frankel represented a district covering several coastal areas in southern Palm Beach County and northern Broward County, from West Palm Beach to Fort Lauderdale.

After a Florida Supreme Court-ordered redistricting, Frankel's district was renumbered the 21st. It lost its share of Broward County, becoming a more compact district in southern Palm Beach County. The justices suggested that it was more logical to have just one district splitting Broward and Palm Beach counties. Her opponent was again Republican Paul Spain. The new 21st was no less Democratic than the old 22nd, and Frankel won with 63% of the vote to Spain's 35%.

2018

With no primary or general opponents, Frankel was reelected.

2020 
With 86% of the vote, Frankel won the Democratic primary against Guido Weiss, a former adviser to Representative Tulsi Gabbard. Frankel went on to win the November general election, defeating Republican nominee Laura Loomer, a far-right activist and conspiracy theorist. Loomer's candidacy was widely considered a long shot, despite endorsements from high-profile Republicans including President Donald Trump, Representative Matt Gaetz, and former Trump adviser Roger Stone.

Committee assignments
Committee on Appropriations

Caucus memberships
 Congressional Arts Caucus
 Congressional Progressive Caucus.
United States Congressional International Conservation Caucus
U.S.-Japan Caucus
Medicare for All Caucus

Political positions

Foreign policy
Frankel supported President Donald Trump's decision to recognize Jerusalem as Israel's capital, saying, "The President's announcement today is consistent with current U.S. law and reaffirms what we already know: Jerusalem is the eternal capital of the Jewish people and the State of Israel."

Gun policy
Frankel supports gun control measures, which she calls "common-sense legislation." Specifically, she supports a high-capacity magazine ban, universal background checks, and a ban on bump stocks.
Frankel supports repealing the 1996 Dickey Amendment, which discourages the CDC from researching gun violence prevention.
Following the Pulse nightclub shooting, Frankel said, "This Congress offers lots of thoughts and sympathies when people are massacred by firearms, but no action to stop the carnage."
After the Sutherland Springs church shooting, Frankel expressed her frustration with gun lobbying organizations and the inaction of Congress, saying: "We’ll pause for a moment of silence and then this Congress will do nothing because the NRA has a stranglehold on it."
She has an "F" rating from the NRA, indicating that the organization does not believe that she protects gun rights.

During her tenure in the House, Frankel has voted on several pieces of gun legislation. She voted against H. R. 38 (the Concealed Carry Reciprocity Act), which would enable concealed carry reciprocity among all states.
In March 2017 Frankel voted against the Veterans Second Amendment Protection Act, which would allow veterans who are considered "mentally incompetent" to purchase ammunition and firearms unless declared a danger by a judge.

Government surveillance 
Frankel has generally opposed measures to rein in government surveillance. Specifically, she voted against the Massie-Lofgren amendments to the Foreign Intelligence Surveillance Act to defund Section 702 surveillance and prevent "backdoor" warrantless FBI surveillance under that authority of US citizens. She voted for House cybersecurity information sharing bills that facilitate surveillance, and for the extension of USA PATRIOT Act financial surveillance (HR 5606). She voted against the USA RIGHTS Act, which would have helped to restore Americans' protections against government surveillance.

Impeachment of President Donald Trump
On December 18, 2019, Frankel voted to impeach President Donald J. Trump. She did so again on January 13, 2021.

See also
 List of Jewish members of the United States Congress
 Women in the United States House of Representatives

References

External links

Congresswoman Lois Frankel official U.S. House website
Lois Frankel for Congress

 

1948 births
21st-century American politicians
21st-century American women politicians
American Jews from Florida
American women lawyers
American lawyers
Boston University alumni
Female members of the United States House of Representatives
Florida lawyers
Georgetown University Law Center alumni
Jewish mayors of places in the United States
Jewish members of the United States House of Representatives
Jewish women politicians
Living people
Democratic Party members of the United States House of Representatives from Florida
Mayors of West Palm Beach, Florida
Democratic Party members of the Florida House of Representatives
Politicians from New York City
Women mayors of places in Florida
Women state legislators in Florida
Jewish American people in Florida politics
21st-century American Jews